Professor Ernest Oliver (Ernie) Tuck was an Australian applied mathematician, notable for his sustained work in ship hydrodynamics, and for Tuck's incompressibility function.

Early life and education
Tuck was born on 1 June 1939 in Adelaide, South Australia. He studied Applied Mathematics for his undergraduate degree at the University of Adelaide, where his principal mentor was Professor R. B. Potts. In 1960, he studied with Fritz Ursell at Cambridge University for his PhD. His PhD thesis was on the application of slender-body theory to ships. In it, he made a revolutionary approach of using matched asymptotic expansions in order to predict the wave resistance of a slender ship.

Career
In 1963 Tuck went to the United States to work with Francis Ogilvie and John Nicholas Newman at the David Taylor Model Basin, and subsequently with Ted Wu at Caltech. He worked on topics related to ship hydrodynamics, acoustics, bio-fluid mechanics, and numerical analysis. Tuck returned to Adelaide University in 1968 as a Reader in Applied Mathematics, and was subsequently appointed the (Sir Thomas) Elder Professor of Mathematics. From 1984 to 1992 he served as Editor of Series B (Applied Mathematics) of the Journal of the Australian Mathematical Society. In 1992 he established TeXAdel, an organization responsible for automating the production of the AMS journals. He served as president of the IUTAM Congress in 2008. He has been a visiting professor at Caltech, Stanford, the University of Michigan, and MIT. Apart from applied mathematics, in his later years he also worked on problems in pure mathematics related to Riemann hypothesis and properties of the zeta function.

Summary

1939 Born: 1 June 1939  Adelaide, South Australia, Australia
1960 University of Adelaide Bachelor of Science with First Class Honours in Mathematics
1963 D Phil (Cambridge) Dissertation: "The steady motion of a slender ship"
1959 Awarded the Sir John Gellibrand Scholarship
1988 Elected as Fellow of the Australian Academy of Science
1990 Awarded the George Weinblum Lectureship
1995 Elected as Fellow of the Australian Academy of Technological Sciences and Engineering
1999 Awarded the Thomas Ranken Lyle Medal

Publications
He published over 180 papers covering a wide range of topics in:
 ship hydrodynamics,
 aerodynamics,
 hydraulics,
 bio-fluid dynamics,
 and games theory.

Personal
Survived by wife Helen (née Wood), two sons Warren and Geoff, and their grandchildren. He and his wife shared a strong interest in backgammon, and other games of chance.

References

External links
Home Page at University of Adelaide
"Obituary" at the School of Mathematical Sciences of the University of Adelaide
"Ernest Oliver Tuck", Biography at the IWWWFB website

20th-century Australian mathematicians
Fellows of the Australian Academy of Science
Fluid dynamicists
University of Adelaide alumni
Academic staff of the University of Adelaide
1939 births
2009 deaths